Devils Punch Bowl State Natural Area is a state day use park on the central Oregon Coast in the United States. It is centered on a large bowl naturally carved in a rock headland which is partially open to the Pacific Ocean. Waves enter the bowl and often violently churn, swirl, and foam. There are at least seventeen large rocks, part of Oregon Islands National Wildlife Refuge, which provide interesting wave viewing, and attract and provide a home for wildlife.

The park encompasses , which includes picnic grounds. There is a trail for access to the beach, and tide pools.

The bowl is thought to have been created when two caves carved by the ocean collapsed.

Whales migrate past the park, in season, and the park, which projects into the Pacific, provides panoramic views of the ocean and good whale watching.

History 
At one time the Punch Bowl was referred to as "Satan's Cauldron". The park was acquired in at least three parcels between 1929 and 1952.  The Civilian Conservation Corps installed a fresh water system,  sanitary works, picnic tables, stoves, trails, and safety fences.

Park attendance in 1963 totaled 228,528 visitors.  June through October is the park's busiest season.

See also 
 List of Oregon state parks
 Whale Watching Center

References

External links 

Parks in Lincoln County, Oregon
State parks of Oregon
1929 establishments in Oregon
Protected areas established in 1929